Cities under republic's jurisdiction (as of 2010):

Districts:

Local self-government
Due to problems of defining the border between Chechnya and Ingushetia, as well as those related to the military operations in the region (First and Second Chechen Wars), both republics have not established a system of local self-government until 2009.

References

 
Ingushetia